Reginald Walter Brock, FRSC, FRGS (10 January 1874 – 30 July 1935) was a Canadian geologist, academic, and civil servant.

He was Director of the Geological Survey of Canada from 1907 to 1914, in addition to being Deputy Minister of Mines in 1914. On the outbreak of the First World War, he joined the Canadian Army. In 1919, he became Professor of Geology and Dean of Applied Sciences at the University of British Columbia. He was President of the Royal Society of Canada in 1935–36.

On 30 July 1935, he was killed in an airplane crash with his wife (who died the following day).

Brock Island and Brock River are named in his honour.

References 

 http://www.biographi.ca/en/bio/brock_reginald_walter_16E.html
 https://www.jstor.org/stable/2569533

1874 births
1935 deaths
Fellows of the Royal Society of Canada
Fellows of the Royal Geographical Society
Geological Survey of Canada personnel
Academic staff of the University of British Columbia
University of Toronto alumni
Queen's University at Kingston alumni
Victims of aviation accidents or incidents in Canada
Victims of aviation accidents or incidents in 1935
Canadian Expeditionary Force officers